Nicolas Clive Ansell (born 2 February 1994) is an Australian professional football (soccer) player who plays as a centre back for Adelaide United in the A-League.

Club career
Ansell spent several years in the Melbourne Victory youth squad before a breakout 2012–13 season, which saw him rewarded with a senior A-League contract. Considered an upcoming future star, he made an immediate impact as a commanding centre back, playing a key role in Melbourne Victory's 2014/15 Premiership-Championship double.

Ansell left the Victory on 12 May 2017.

In June 2017, Ansell signed with Portuguese Primeira Liga side Tondela.

In July 2018, Ansell returned to Melbourne to re-join Melbourne Victory.

On 31 January 2019, Ansell departed the Victory a second time, joining K League 2 team Jeonnam Dragons

In October 2020, Ansell returned to Melbourne Victory for a third time. He was released on 11 June 2021.

In July 2021, Ansell joined Adelaide United for the 2021–22 A-League season.

Honours
Melbourne Victory:
 A-League Championship: 2014–2015
 A-League Premiership: 2014–2015

References

External links
 

Living people
1994 births
Australian soccer players
Association football defenders
Australia under-20 international soccer players
Australia youth international soccer players
A-League Men players
Victorian Premier League players
Melbourne Victory FC players
Bentleigh Greens SC players
C.D. Tondela players
Jeonnam Dragons players
Adelaide United FC players
K League 2 players
Australian expatriate sportspeople in Portugal
Australian expatriate sportspeople in South Korea
Australian expatriate soccer players
Expatriate footballers in Portugal
Expatriate footballers in South Korea
People educated at Carey Baptist Grammar School
Soccer players from Melbourne